Onosma is a genus of flowering plants in the family Boraginaceae. They are native to the Mediterranean and western Asia. They grow in dry, sunny habitats with rocky, sandy substrates. Some are popular as rock garden plants.

Estimates of the number of species in the genus range from about 85 or 88 to 150. The systematics are unclear and the group is in need of study and revision.

Selected species

 Onosma adenopus
 Onosma affinis 
 Onosma aksoyii
 Onosma alborosea 
 Onosma album
 Onosma apiculatum 
 Onosma arenaria 
 Onosma atila-ocakii
 Onosma aucheranum 
 Onosma beyazoglui
 Onosma borysthenica
 Onosma bourgaei
 Onosma bracteatum 
 Onosma bubanii
 Onosma bulbotrichum 
 Onosma canescens 
 Onosma cassium 
 Onosma caucasica    
 Onosma caerulescens 
 Onosma cingulatum
 Onosma confertum
 Onosma decastichum
 Onosma dalmatica 
 Onosma dicedens 
 Onosma dichroantha 
 Onosma echioides
 Onosma elegantissimum 
 Onosma erectum 
 Onosma exsertum
 Onosma farreri
 Onosma fastigiata 
 Onosma fistulosum
 Onosma frutescens
 Onosma fruticosum
 Onosma gigantea 
 Onosma glomeratum
 Onosma glmelinii
 Onosma graeca 
 Onosma helvetica
 Onosma hispidum 
 Onosma hookeri
 Onosma irritans
 Onosma isauricum 
 Onosma javorkae 
 Onosma kaheirei
 Onosma lijiangense
 Onosma liui
 Onosma luquanense
 Onosma maaikangense
 Onosma macrochaeta
 Onosma mertensioides
 Onosma molle
 Onosma multiramaosum
 Onosma nangqenense
 Onosma nanum
 Onosma orientalis 
 Onosma paniculatum
 Onosma polioxanthum 
 Onosma polychroma 
 Onosma pseudoarenaria
 Onosma rascheyana 
 Onosma rigida
 Onosma setosa
 Onosma simplicissimum
 Onosma sinicum
 Onosma stelluata 
 Onosma straussii
 Onosma stridii 
 Onosma taurica 
 Onosma tenuiflora
 Onosma tornensis 
 Onosma tricerosperma 
 Onosma troodi 
 Onosma visianii 
 Onosma waddellii
 Onosma waltonii
 Onosma wardii
 Onosma yajiangense
 Onosma zayueense

Notes

 
Boraginaceae genera
Taxa named by Carl Linnaeus